Arrentela is a former civil parish in the municipality (concelho) of Seixal, Lisbon metropolitan area, Portugal. In 2013, the parish merged into the new parish Seixal, Arrentela e Aldeia de Paio Pires. The population in 2011 was 28,886, in an area of 10.17 km². It is situated on the south side of the estuary of the river Tagus.

Localities

The freguesia of Arrentela included the following localities:

Casal do Marco
Casal de Santo António
Cavadas
Cavaquinhas
Pinhal dos Frades
Torre da Marinha

Places of interest

Moinho do Breyner

Sporting club

Atletico Clube de Arrentela

References

External links
  Official page of the parish of Arrentela 

Former parishes of Seixal